Acrobasis coryliella is a species of snout moth in the genus Acrobasis. It was described by Harrison Gray Dyar Jr. in 1908, and is known from the eastern United States.

There is one generation per year.

The larvae feed on Corylus species. The larvae construct a frass tube on the undersurface of a leaf of the host plant. Pupation takes place in a pupal chamber which is constructed at the end of the tube.

References

Moths described in 1908
Acrobasis
Moths of North America